Pilluchu (also spelled Pillucho) is an archaeological site in the Ayacucho Region in Peru on top of a mountain of the same name. It lies in the Vilcas Huamán Province, Vilcas Huamán District, southwest of Vilcashuamán.

References 

Archaeological sites in Peru
Archaeological sites in Ayacucho Region
Mountains of Peru
Mountains of Ayacucho Region